The Continental intercalaire, sometimes referred to as the Continental intercalaire Formation, is a term applied to Cretaceous strata in Northern Africa. Fossils, including dinosaurs, have been recovered from this formation. The Continental intercalaire stretches from Algeria, Tunisia and Niger in the west to Egypt and Sudan in the east.

Fossil content

Archosaurs
Aegyptosaurus baharijensis
Bahariasaurus ingens
"Brachiosaurus" nougaredi
Carcharodontosaurus saharicus
cf. Carcharodontosaurus sp.
Iguanodontia indet.
Inosaurus tedreftensis
Nigersaurus taqueti
Paralititan stromeri? (remains may instead represent Aegyptosaurus)
Rebbachisaurus ?tamesnensis
Ornithopoda indet. (multiple species)
Sauropoda indet. (multiple species)
Spinosaurus aegyptiacus
cf. Spinosaurus
Theropoda indet. (2-4 separate species)
Theropoda indet. (=Elaphrosaurus iguidiensis)

Fish
Mawsonia (several species)
Onchopristis numidus

See also
 List of dinosaur-bearing rock formations

References

Cretaceous paleontological sites of Africa
Geologic groups of Africa
Cretaceous Africa